Chopin Music In The Open Air or Chopin Fest is an annual international festival of music of Polish composer Frederic Chopin (1810-1849). It is held in a historical and cultural complex The Radomysl Castle (Radomyshl, Zhytomyr region, Ukraine), in 2014.

It was launched by Olga Bogomolets, a Ukrainian physician and civic activist. Co-organizers of the festival are the Embassy of Poland in Ukraine, the Polish Institute in Kyiv and The Radomysl Castle.

The festival's specific feature is that the audience listens to the music outdoors, on one of the islands in the Castle, scattering freely all across the island, sitting on benches, chairs or lying on mats spread out on the grass. Besides, the music that pianists perform can be heard inside the Castle, namely in the St. Michael's Hall, where concerts of chamber music take place.

The aim of the festival is to popularize the works of Chopin among Ukrainians and to facilitate more close contacts between Ukrainian and Polish people.

History 
The first Chopin Music In The Open Air Festival was held on June, 14–15, 2014. Its participants were: Piotr Szychowski, the winner of international piano contests in Rome, Bucharest, Takasaki, Darmstadt, Ettlingen, Bydgoszcz, Łódź and Warsaw; Inessa Poroshina, the soloist of the National Philharmonic of Ukraine; Larisa Deordiyeva, the soloist of the National Philharmonic of Ukraine, the winner of the All-Ukrainian Lysenko competition of pianists; the students of music schools in Kyiv.

The 2nd festival had taken place on June 13–14, 2015. Among the participants were: Jacek Kortus, the 1st prize and "Grand Prix" winner of the 10th International Chopin Contest in Antonin (Poland), the 1st prize winner of All-Polish piano contest Competition named after prof. Ludwik Stefański in Plock (Poland); Tatiana Shafran, Inessa Poroshina, the students of music schools in Kyiv and Zhytomyr.

The 3rd festival took place on June, 11–12, 2016.

The 4th festival was held on June, 17–18, 2017  This time its main attraction were young piano players from the Western and Eastern regions of Ukraine. One of the festival's participants, 13-years old Victoria Tkachuk (Radomyshl. Zhytomyr region), took afterwards the Grand-Prix in the prestigious international music contest "The City of Leon" in Lviv.

The 5th festival took place on June, 23–24, 2018. This time its main feature was the promotion of young talented students of musical schools from different Ukraine's regions.

The Chopin Music In The Open Air Festival is attended by the ambassadors of Belgium, Latvia, Moldavia, Romania, Serbia, France, Kyrgyzstan, South Korea, Pakistan, Turkey and Japan in Ukraine.

Charity 
The festival Chopin Music In The Open Air is charitable. The money from ticket sales are transferred with the help of public project "People helping people" to the families of those killed in the Revolution of Dignity and war in the Eastern Ukraine against Russian occupants. For the same purpose, a charity fair is planned on the third Chopin Festival in Radomyshl.

See also 

Frédéric Chopin
Olga Bogomolets
Radomysl Castle

External links 
The Official Site of Chopin Music In The Open Air Festival
The Official Site of the Radomysl Castle
Concerts of Jacek Kortus on Chopin Music In The Open Air. The Official Site of Polish Institute in Kyiv
The Official Site of People Helping People

References 

Classical music festivals in Ukraine
Tourist attractions in Zhytomyr Oblast
Frédéric Chopin